Charles Maurice Couyba (1 January 1866 – 18 November 1931) was a French professor and politician. He was a deputy from 1897 to 1907, then a senator from 1907 to 1920. 
He was Minister of Commerce and Industry from 1911 to 1912, and was briefly Minister of Labor and Social Welfare in 1914.
Under the pseudonym of Maurice Boukay he was also a poet and songwriter.

Life

Charles Maurice Couyba was born on 1 January 1866 in Dampierre-sur-Salon, Haute-Saône.
Couyba obtained an Associate of Philosophy degree in history and a doctorate in law.
He started out as a journalist before moving into politics.
He was elected general counsel of Haute-Saône in 1895.

Couyba was deputy for Haute-Saône from 1897 to 1907.
He joined the radical left group in the Chamber, and was mainly involved in questions related to art and education.
He was rapporteur for the Fine Arts budget from 1902 to 1907. 
His 1902 book on The Art and Democracy was based on his report on the fine Arts budget.
The book proposes a policy that reconciles the principles of "freedom" and "authority", where the state supports but does not overly restrict the arts.
Under the pseudonym "Maurice Boukay" he was author of the Chansons rouges.

Couyba was elected to the Senate on 7 January 1907 and reelected on 3 January 1909.
He was Minister of Commerce and Industry from 27 June 1911 to 11 January 1912.
He was Minister of Labor and Social Assurance from 13 June 1914 to 26 August 1914.
He left the Senate on 10 January 1920, when he failed to be reelected.
He died on 18 November 1931 in Paris.

Posterity

Charles Maurice Couyba was represented by Jules Adler and Arnaud Courlet de Vregille.

Publications

References

1866 births
1931 deaths
Senators of Haute-Saône
French Senators of the Third Republic
French Ministers of Labour and Social Affairs
French Ministers of Commerce
People from Haute-Saône